So They Say Is Pete Francis's first solo album. So They Say features acoustic music with some pop influence, similar to many of the earlier works of his former band, Dispatch. Songs "Burning the River" and "Carry You," were, in fact, often played together with Dispatch, and "Carry You" was re-recorded for a Dispatch record. Other songs on the album, though some seem to have been abandoned, still remain in live rotation, for example, "Father Rose" and "If I May."

Tracklisting 
 Burning The River
 Father Rose
 During The Storm
 If I May
 Train Window
 I Don't Wanna Fight
 Auburndale
 Carry You
 Go Ridin'
 So They Say

2001 debut albums
Pete Francis Heimbold albums